And Soon the Darkness, also known as Prisioneras de la oscuridad, is a 2010 American-Argentine mystery thriller film directed by Marcos Efron and starring Karl Urban, Amber Heard and Odette Annable. It is a remake of the British film And Soon the Darkness (1970). The screenplay was written by Jennifer Derwingson and Marcos Efron.

Plot
Two young American women, Stephanie and Ellie, are backpacking through South America. On their last day in Argentina, they decide to stay in a small hotel. After a drunken night at the local bar, where they encounter some of the local men, the two miss the bus that was supposed to take them to their next destination. Since the bus only comes once per day, they decide to head down to the nearby river to relax and enjoy their extra day off.

The trip takes a turn for the worse when the two are separated after a heated argument, and Ellie is kidnapped. While Stephanie desperately searches for her friend, she is joined by Michael, an American who claims to be looking for his girlfriend who disappeared months before.

The duo is assisted by the town's only police officer, who acts oddly suspicious. Stephanie finds the hide-out where the kidnapper has taken Ellie and manages to rescue her, but Ellie is later killed in the escape by the man who kidnapped her.

The policeman appears and lures Stephanie into his car. By finding her passport there, she understands that the lone police officer was behind all the missing girls. Michael grabs the policeman's weapon. The policeman offers to trade Michael's girlfriend, Camila, for Stephanie. Michael agrees but is shot by the policeman using a second weapon.

Stephanie is taken by the policeman and the kidnapper to be sold. This time she escapes herself by jumping off a boat and kills the kidnapper. On the shore, she is caught by the buyer and the policeman, but escapes again. She is eventually able to kill the policeman near the Paraguayan border.

Cast

Production 
The film was shot in March 2009 in Argentina.

Release 
The film was released on February 18, 2010, as part of the European film market in Germany and was scheduled for a theatrical release on February 11, 2011, over Optimum Releasing in the United Kingdom. On May 14, 2010, Anchor Bay acquired the rights for US distribution of the film, giving it a limited theatrical run starting December 17, 2010.

Home media
The film was released on DVD and Blu-ray Disc on December 28, 2010.

Reception
On Rotten Tomatoes the film has an approval rating of 17% based on reviews from six critics.

References

External links
 
 

2010 films
2010 crime thriller films
2010 independent films
2010s mystery thriller films
American crime thriller films
American mystery thriller films
American independent films
American remakes of British films
2010s English-language films
Films about kidnapping
Films about missing people
Films about murderers
Films about vacationing
Films set in Argentina
Films shot in Argentina
Films scored by Tomandandy
American mystery horror films
StudioCanal films
2010s American films